Birth and the Burial is the debut studio album by American heavy metal supergroup Act of Defiance. It was released on August 21, 2015, through Metal Blade Records.

A music video for the song "Throwback" was released on June 24, 2015, with another for "Legion of Lies" following on August 6, 2015.

Reception

Birth and the Burial has received positive reaction from critics. Rock Hard magazine gave the album a score of nine out of ten, calling it an "engaging thrash metal album [...] One of the best releases of 2015!" Writing for Sputnikmusic, Thompson Gerhart concluded that Birth and the Burial "both starts off on a good foot and leaves some room for improvement."

Track listing

Personnel
Act of Defiance
Henry Derek – vocals 
Chris Broderick – guitars
Matt Bachand – bass guitar
Shawn Drover – drums

Production
Travis Smith – artwork

References

2015 debut albums
Act of Defiance albums
Metal Blade Records albums
Albums produced by Chris "Zeuss" Harris